Trémaouézan is a commune in the Finistère department of Brittany in north-western France.

Population
Inhabitants of Trémaouézan are called in French tréviens.

See also
Communes of the Finistère department
List of the works of Bastien and Henry Prigent
Trémaouézan Parish close

References

External links

Official website

Mayors of Finistère Association 

Communes of Finistère